Teodoro Casana Robles (April 1, 1900 – April 21, 1986) was a Peruvian lawyer, historian, journalist, archaeologist, photographer and geographer.

20th-century Peruvian lawyers
Peruvian academics
20th-century Peruvian historians
Peruvian archaeologists
Peruvian photographers
Peruvian journalists
Male journalists
Peruvian male writers
1900 births
1986 deaths
20th-century male writers
20th-century archaeologists
20th-century journalists